

Appointed
Matsuda Michiyuki 1871-1875
Koteda Yasusada 1875-1884
Kojiro Iwasaki 1890-1891
Orita Hiraochi 1897-1899
Sada Suzuki 1902-1907
Kaiichiro Suematsu 1923-1925
Morio Takahashi 1925-1926
Shinya Kurosaki 1926-1927
Inada Syūichi 1945-1946

Elected
Iwakichi Hattori 1947-1954
Kotaro Mori 1954-1958
Kyujiro Taniguchi 1958-1966
Kinichiro Nozaki 1966-1974
Masayoshi Takemura 1974-1986
Minoru Inaba 1986-1998
Yoshitsugu Kunimatsu 1998-2006
Yukiko Kada 2006-2014
Taizō Mikazuki 2014–present

 
Shiga Prefecture